The 58th season of the Campeonato Gaúcho kicked off on July 30, 1978, and ended on December 17, 1978. Twenty teams participated. Internacional won their 25th title. Associação Santa Cruz and Santo Ângelo were relegated.

Participating teams

System 
The championship would have four stages.:

 First phase: The twenty clubs would be divided into four groups of five teams. The teams of the group A would play against the teams from group B twice, and the teams of group C would play twice against the teams of Group D. The top teams of each group would then play the semifinals in a two-legged knockout round. the winners of the semifinals qualified to the Final phase, and later, the Semifinals winners would play the Finals, the winner of which earned an extra point to the Final phase.
 Second phase: On the same groups as the previous phase, the teams of the group A would play against the teams from group C twice, and the teams of group B would play twice against the teams of Group D. The top teams of each group would then play the semifinals in a two-legged knockout round. the winners of the semifinals qualified to the Final phase, and later, the Semifinals winners would play the Finals, the winner of which earned an extra point to the Final phase.
 Torneio da Morte: The bottom-placed team counting First and second stages would be relegated; Two teams among the eliminated would play against each other three times to define the other team that would be relegated into the Second level.
 Final phase (Copa 60 Anos FGF): The six remaining teams (four qualified through the championship and two through the Taça Presidente Rubens Freire Hoffmeister) played each other in a double round-robin system; the team with the most points won the title.

Taça Presidente Rubens Freire Hoffmeister 
The Taça Presidente Rubens Freire Hoffmeister would be played in the first semester by the 15 teams that were slated to play in the championship aside of those that participated in the Campeonato Brasileiro at the time.

In the first stage, The 15 teams would be divided into four groups. All qualified to the second phase, with the two best teams in each group qualifying to Group E and the others qualifying to Group F. In the second phase, each team played twice against the teams of their own group. The four best teams of Group E and the two best teams of Group F qualified to the Final phase, which would also be disputed in a double round-robin format, with the two bet teams qualifying to the Final phase of the Campeonato Gaúcho.

First phase

Group A

Group B

Group C

Group D

Second phase

Group E

Group F

Final phase

Playoffs

Championship

First phase

Group A

Group B

Group C

Group D

Semifinals

Finals

Second phase

Group A

Group B

Group C

Group D

Semifinals

Finals

Final standings

Torneio da Morte

Copa 60 Anos FGF

Playoffs

References 

Campeonato Gaúcho seasons
Gaúcho